Mikel Antía Mendiaraz (born 13 February 1973) is a Spanish football coach and former player who played as a central defender.

References

External links

1973 births
Living people
Footballers from San Sebastián
Spanish footballers
Association football defenders
La Liga players
Segunda División players
Segunda División B players
Real Madrid Castilla footballers
RC Celta de Vigo players
Real Valladolid players
Real Sociedad footballers
CD Numancia players
Elche CF players
SD Ponferradina players
Real Unión footballers
Primeira Liga players
S.C. Braga players
Spanish expatriate footballers
Spanish expatriate sportspeople in Portugal
Expatriate footballers in Portugal
Spanish expatriate sportspeople in Qatar
Spanish expatriate sportspeople in England
Spanish expatriate sportspeople in China
Spanish expatriate sportspeople in the United States
Charlotte FC non-playing staff